Platte Lake is a lake in the U.S. state of Minnesota.

Platte Lake is the source of the Platte River, hence the name.

References

Lakes of Minnesota
Lakes of Crow Wing County, Minnesota
Lakes of Morrison County, Minnesota